Hyacinthe is a given name.  

Hyacinthe may also refer to:
Hyacinthe, Martinique, a village and a headland in the commune of Le Robert
Saint-Hyacinthe, Quebec, a city in Canada
Kimberly Hyacinthe (born 1989), Canadian athlete specializing in the sprinting events
Cyclone Hyacinthe, the wettest tropical cyclone on record worldwide

See also
Hyacinth (disambiguation)